Juan Ignacio Baiardino (born 26 September 1999) is an Argentine professional footballer who plays as a forward in Defensores de Belgrano, on loan from Boca Juniors.

Career
Baiardino began his youth career at a local club in Ramos Mejía, before heading to an Argentine subsidiary team of Spanish side Barcelona at the age of nine. In 2012, Baiardino joined the academy of Boca Juniors. He signed his first professional contract on 15 September 2020, prior to sealing a loan move to Primera Nacional with Chacarita Juniors; penning terms until 31 December 2021. After debuting in a defeat away to Instituto on 28 November, Baiardino scored goals for the club against Quilmes and Almagro across seven appearances in 2020; just one of which was as a starter.

After 15 months at Chacarita, Baiardino returned to Boca Juniors. Shortly after, on 9 January 2022, he was sent out on a new loan spell, this time at Defensores de Belgrano for a year.

Career statistics
.

Notes

References

External links

1999 births
Living people
Footballers from Buenos Aires
Argentine footballers
Association football forwards
Primera Nacional players
Boca Juniors footballers
Chacarita Juniors footballers
Defensores de Belgrano footballers